Palaeoheterodonta is a subclass of bivalve molluscs.  It contains the extant orders Unionida (freshwater mussels) and Trigoniida. They are distinguished by having the two halves of the shell be of equal size and shape, but by having the hinge teeth be in a single row, rather than separated into two groups, as they are in the clams and cockles.

2010 Taxonomy of the Palaeoheterodonta
In 2010 a new proposed classification system for the Bivalvia was published in by Bieler, Carter & Coan revising the classification of the Bivalvia, including the subclass Paleoheterodonta.  Superfamilies and families as listed by Bieler et al.  Use of † indicate families and superfamilies that are extinct.

Subclass: Palaeoheterodonta

Order: Trigoniida

†Beichuanioidea Liu & Gu, 1988
†Beichuaniidae Liu & Gu, 1988
†Megatrigonioidea Van Hoepen, 1929
†Megatrigoniidae Van Hoepen, 1929
†Iotrigoniidae Savelive, 1958
†Rutitrigoniidae Van Hoepen, 1929
†Myophorelloidea Kobayashi, 1954
†Myophorellidae Kobayashi, 1954
†Buchotrigoniidae <small>Leanza, 1993</small</small>
†Laevitrigoniidae Savelive, 1958
†Vaugoniidae Kobayashi, 1954
Trigonioidea Lamarck, 1819
Trigoniidae Lamarck, 1819
†Eoschizodidae Newell & Boyd, 1975 (syn: Curtonotidae)
†Groeberellidae Pérez, Reyes, & Danborenea 1995
†Myophoriidae Bronn, 1849 (syn: Cytherodontidae, Costatoriidae, Gruenewaldiidae)
†Prosogyrotrigoniidae Kobayashi, 1954
†Scaphellinidae Newell & Ciriacks, 1962
†Schizodidae Newell & Boyd, 1975
†Sinodoridae Pojeta & Zhang, 1984

Order: Unionida

Superfamily †Archanodontoidea Modell, 1957 (placement in Unionoida uncertain)
Family †Archanodontidae Modell, 1957
Superfamily Etherioidea Deshayes, 1832
Family Etheriidae Deshayes, 1832 (syn: Mulleriidae, Pseudomulleriidae)
Family Iridinidae Swainson, 1840 (syn: Mutelidae, Pleiodontidae)
Family Mycetopodidae Gray, 1840
Superfamily Hyrioidea Swainson, 1840
Family Hyriidae Swainson, 1840
Superfamily †Trigonioidoidea Cox, 1952
Family †Trigonioididae Cox, 1952
Family †Jilinoconchidae Ma, 1989 (placement uncertain)
Family †Nakamuranaiadidae Guo, 1981 (syn:Sinonaiinae, Nippononaiidae)
Family †Plicatounionidae Chen, 1988
Family †Pseudohyriidae Kobayashi, 1968
Family †Sainschandiidae Kolesnikov, 1977
Superfamily Unionoidea Rafinesque, 1820
Family Unionidae Rafinesque, 1820
Family Liaoningiidae Yu & Dong, 1993 (placement uncertain)
Family Margaritiferidae Henderson, 1929 (syn:Margaritaninae, Cumberlandiinae, Promargaritiferidae)
Family †Sancticarolitidae Simone & Mezzalira, 1997

References

Bivalve taxonomy
Mollusc subclasses